Type 82 may refer to the following:

Type 82 artillery, a Chinese multiple rocket launcher
Type 82 destroyer, a British warship.
Type 82, a Chinese-made version of the Polish PM-63 submachine gun.
Type 82 Volkswagen Kübelwagen, a German military vehicle.
GSL 131 a.k.a. Type 82, a Chinese mine-clearing armoured bulldozer
Type 82 (vehicle), a Japanese 6×6 command and communications vehicle
Model 1981 "Shin'heung" (also known as Type 82 tank), a North Korean amphibious light tank also known as the PT-85